"Back When I Knew It All" is a song written by Trent Willmon, Gary Hannan, and Phil O'Donnell, and recorded by American country music duo Montgomery Gentry. It was released in February 2008 as the lead off single and title track from their album of the same name. The song debuted at #49 on the Hot Country Songs chart dated March 1, 2008, and on the chart week of July 12, 2008, it became the duo's fourth Number One hit.

Content 
The song is a moderate up-tempo, described as sounding similar to The Byrds. It features both members of the duo describing their later teen years — buying a pickup truck, sneaking into a bar, and even being imprisoned. After reflecting on their experiences, they then list the various lessons they've learned since their rebellious beginnings (such as how "A Sunday sermon can turn life around"), eventually stating that they were "learning so much more than / Back when [they] knew it all".

Chart performance

Year-end charts

References 

2008 singles
2008 songs
Montgomery Gentry songs
Songs written by Trent Willmon
Columbia Nashville Records singles
Song recordings produced by Blake Chancey
Songs written by Phil O'Donnell (songwriter)